The Campaign for Better Health Care (CBHC) is a coalition of  healthcare advocates, labor unions, and nonprofit organizations working to bring a single-payer healthcare system to the United States. Based in Illinois, it was founded by Jim Duffet in 1989.

History

In 1988, a handful of downstate community organizations (Danville Area Community Services Council and the Champaign County Health Care Consumers) and statewide grassroots health care organizations (Illinois Alliance for Retired Americans, then Illinois State Council of Senior Citizens; Illinois Citizen Action, then Illinois Public Action Council; and the Coalition for Consumer Rights) established the Campaign for Better Health Care to provide a central statewide grassroots health care reform organization.

The Health Care Justice Act, which was sponsored by Barack Obama in the Illinois State Senate, grew out of work done by the Campaign for Better Health Care. According to Edward McClelland, the Affordable Care Act finds its origin in this legislative battle.

References

Healthcare reform advocacy groups in the United States
Human welfare organizations based in Chicago
Non-profit organizations based in Chicago
Politics of Illinois
Health campaigns
Medical and health organizations based in Illinois